Brun-Otto Bryde (born 1 February 1943) is a German legal scholar and a former judge of the Federal Constitutional Court of Germany.

Life
Bryde was born in Hamburg on 12 January 1943. Following his first state exam in law 1966 and his second one in 1969 he did his doctoral degree in Hamburg in 1971. After that he became an instructor at a university in Ethiopia. Between 1973 and 1974 he was a Law and Modernization Fellow at the Yale Law School. Later, from 1974 until 1982, he was a teacher at the university of Hamburg. 1980 he did his habilitation and afterwards he became a professor at Bundeswehr University of Munich. Since 1987 he is a professor at the University of Giessen. He was a visiting professor two times at the University of Wisconsin Law School in 1989 and 1994 as well. Bryde was also a member of the Convention on the Elimination of All Forms of Racial Discrimination. From 2001 to 2011 he was a judge at the Federal Constitutional Court of Germany (1st. Senate). He was the first judge of the Federal Constitutional Court to be elected  on the proposal of the Green party. He was succeeded by judge Susanne Baer.

References
Website of the Federal Constitutional Court of Germany

1943 births
Living people
Justices of the Federal Constitutional Court
Grand Crosses with Star and Sash of the Order of Merit of the Federal Republic of Germany
Academic staff of Bundeswehr University Munich
21st-century German judges
People educated at the Sankt-Ansgar-Schule
Jurists from Hamburg